The Inside Out Film and Video Festival, also known as the Inside Out LGBT or LGBTQ Film Festival, is an annual Canadian film festival, which presents a program of LGBT-related film. The festival is staged in both Toronto and Ottawa. Founded in 1991, the festival is now the largest of its kind in Canada. Deadline dubbed it "Canada’s foremost LGBTQ film festival."

The organization also presents a series of film screenings throughout the year outside of the dedicated festival, as well as a touring program of short film screenings in smaller towns and cities within Southern Ontario. The organization's current executive director is Lauren Howes, who succeeded Andria Wilson in 2021.

Toronto LGBT Film Festival

First held at Toronto's Euclid Theatre in 1991, Inside Out celebrated its festival with a small community of people who yearned to see film and video created by and about lesbians, gays, bisexuals, and transgender people. The festival was briefly the subject of controversy in 1993, when Metro Toronto council refused an arts grant to support the 1994 festival on the grounds of "community standards", even though the council had given grants to the festival in both 1991 and 1992 without issue. The festival was able to make up the lost funding that year when numerous arts organizations in the city, including the Art Gallery of Ontario, the Toronto International Film Festival, the National Ballet School, Tarragon Theatre, Theatre Passe Muraille, and the Danny Grossman Dance Company made donations to the festival.

The festival has since expanded to incorporate a variety of programs related to the promotion and development of LGBT films and filmmakers in Canada. Currently the largest event of its kind in Canada, Deadline dubbed it "Canada’s foremost LGBTQ film festival." Previously staged at a variety of venues in Toronto, the festival is now staged at the TIFF Bell Lightbox.

Since 2009, RBC Royal Bank has served as the presenting sponsor of the Toronto Festival. The festival bills itself as "a not-for-profit registered charity that exists to challenge attitudes and change lives through the promotion, production and exhibition of film made by and about lesbian, gay, bisexual and trans (LGBT) people of all ages, races and abilities."

In 2016, a number of local activists launched the Toronto Queer Film Festival, an alternative intended for filmmakers and audiences who perceive Inside Out's current programming as too commercialized and mainstream.

In March 2020, the festival organizers announced that due to the COVID-19 pandemic in Canada, the 2020 festival, normally scheduled for May, would be postponed to October. In July, they announced that the Toronto and Ottawa events would be combined into a single digital event. Due to the unique online nature of the event, the winners of the juried awards were announced at the beginning of the festival, as a tool to help publicize the winners during the festival, although audience-voted awards were still announced after the festival's conclusion.

The 2021 festival returned to the event's traditional scheduling in late May, although it was still staged online. The event was available to viewers throughout Ontario; the films in the Spotlight on Canada program were screened for free through a sponsorship agreement with the Canadian Broadcasting Corporation.

The online platform that was used for both the 2020 and 2021 festivals is also planned to remain in permanent operation, both as a year-round distribution platform for LGBTQ films and as an additional accessibility option once the festival is able to return to traditional physical screenings.

Ottawa LGBT Film Festival
In 2007, the Inside Out festival expanded to Ottawa, soon after the demise of the city's earlier Making Scenes Film and Video Festival. Originally presented at the ByTowne Cinema, since 2016 the event has been staged at the National Gallery of Canada.

In 2009, the festival faced controversy when the Canada Border Services Agency impounded prints of the films Patrik, Age 1.5, I Can't Think Straight, and Clapham Junction that were en route to the festival, even though all three films had previously been screened elsewhere in Canada without incident.

Other programs
In addition to the annual film festival events, the Inside Out organization also offers a number of dedicated training and funding programs to foster the creation of LGBT-themed film in Canada.

In 1998, with the support of Charles Street Video, Inside Out initiated the Queer Video Mentorship Project to provide opportunities for youth to learn video production in a supportive atmosphere. Queer youth under the age of 25 are mentored through the process of making their first videos, from storyboarding and shooting to post-production and editing. In celebration of the festival's 20th anniversary in 2010, Inside Out expanded this into a multi-generational program bringing together LGBT youth and seniors over the age of 55. To date, close to 100 new artists have created work through the project. The works are screened at the festival and many go on to play at festivals around the globe. Each year, the works are compiled and distributed free to schools and community organizations.

In 2001, Inside Out launched the inaugural John Bailey Film and Video Completion Fund. Named in recognition of the contribution of a longtime Inside Out supporter and advisory board member, the fund awards grants ranging from $500 to $2,000 to Canadian filmmakers with work in the final stages of production.

Inaugurated in 2002, the Mark S. Bonham Scholarship for Queer Studies in Film and Video awards a $5,000 cash scholarship to a Canadian student who identifies as lesbian, gay, bisexual or transgender, to pursue post-secondary studies in the field of film or video. The first scholarship was awarded in September 2002 to Adam Garnet Jones from Vancouver. Subsequent recipients were Mary Fogarty, Christopher Sanchez, Jung Kim, Cam Matamoros, Jo Simalaya Alcampo, Rachel Smyth, and Jordan Tannahill.

In 2018, the festival launched the Focus Fund to support work by LGBTQ female and non-binary filmmakers. It also organizes an annual Finance Forum, providing an opportunity for emerging filmmakers to pitch LGBT-related projects in development to potential production funders.

In 2019, the festival partnered with streaming service Crave as a branding partner on the service's new portal for LGBTQ film and television content, as well as launching a partnership with Netflix to support the development and funding of new LGBTQ-oriented film and television content in Canada.

In 2020, through the Focus Fund, the festival launched a special emergency relief fund, offering grants of up to $2,500 to projects impacted by the COVID-19 pandemic. The festival was also one of the key partners, alongside Outfest Los Angeles, the Frameline Film Festival, and the New York Lesbian, Gay, Bisexual, & Transgender Film Festival, in launching the North American Queer Festival Alliance, an initiative to further publicize and promote LGBT film.

Inside Out Arts Endowment Fund

The Inside Out Arts Endowment Fund was established in December 2001 through the Ontario Arts Foundation to provide a stable base of funding for Inside Out in the future. The fund was created thanks to a generous founding gift from Mark Bonham of $200,000, and it is currently valued at close to $300,000. Supporters of Inside Out can make tax-deductible donations specifically to the Endowment Fund.

Awards

Audience Award for Best Feature Film
1998 - Everything Will Be Fine (Alles wird gut), Angelina Maccarone
1999 - Better Than Chocolate, Anne Wheeler
2000 - The Adventures of Felix (Drôle de Félix), Olivier Ducastel and Jacques Martineau
2001 - Big Eden, Thomas Bezucha
2002 - Gypsy 83, Todd Stephens
2003 - Madame Satã, Karim Aïnouz
2004 - Latter Days, C. Jay Cox
2005 - Saving Face, Alice Wu
2006 - A Love to Hide, Christian Faure
2007 - The Bubble, Eytan Fox
2008 - Were the World Mine, Tom Gustafson
2009 - The Baby Formula, Alison Reid
2010 - The Secret Diaries of Miss Anne Lister, James Kent
2011 - Weekend, Andrew Haigh
2012 - Margarita, Dominique Cardona and Laurie Colbert
2013 - Reaching for the Moon, Bruno Barreto
2014 - Tru Love, Kate Johnston and Shauna MacDonald
2015 - 4th Man Out, Andrew Nackman
2016 - Angry Indian Goddesses, Pan Nalin
2017 - Sisterhood, Tracy Choi
2018 - White Rabbit, Daryl Wein
2019 - Billie and Emma, Samantha Lee
2020 - Gossamer Folds, Lisa Donato
2021 - Love, Spells and All That, Ümit Ünal
2022 - We Will Never Belong, Amelia Eloisa

Audience Award for Best Short Film
1998 - Jangri, Safiya Randera and My Cunt, Deb Strutt and Liz Baulch
1999 - Below the Belt, Laurie Colbert and Dominique Cardona; Pom, Joanna Ingalls and Mocha Jean Herrup
2000 - Crush, Phillip Bartell
2001 - Interviews with My Next Girlfriend, Cassandra Nicolaou 
2002 - Dildo Diaries, Laura Barton, Judy Wilder and Carol Cunningham
2003 - I Am Good Inside, Jo Si Malaya
2004 - Listen, Susan Justin
2005 - Irene Williams: Queen of Lincoln Road, Eric Smith
2006 - Latch Key, Garth Bardsley and In Search of My Chinese Girlfriend, Lisa Wong
2007 - Hello, My Name Is Herman, Karine Silverwoman
2008 - Pariah, Dee Rees
2009 - Get Happy: A Coming of Age Musical Extravaganza, Mark Payne
2010 - The Armoire, Jamie Travis
2011 - Change, Melissa Osborne and Jeff McCutcheon
2012 - N/A
2013 - Stop Calling Me Honey Bunny, Gabrielle Zilkha
2014 - Living in the Overlap, Cindy Hill and Mary Dalton 
2015 - In the Hollow, Austin Lee Bunn
2016 - Oh-Be-Joyful, Susan Jacobson
2017 - Picture This, Jari Osborne
2018 - Pop Rox, Nate Trinrud
2019 - Thrive, Jamie Dispirito
2020 - The Butterfly, Shiho Fukada
2021 - Noor & Layla, Fawzia Mirza
2022 - How Not to Date While Trans, Nyala Moon

Best Canadian Film
1998 - The Grace of God, John L'Ecuyer
1999 - Laugh in the Dark, Justine Pimlott
2000 - Johnny Greyeyes, Jorge Manzano
2001 - Hey, Happy!, Noam Gonick; My Left Breast, Gerry Rogers
2002 - Miss 501: A Portrait of Luck, Clint Alberta
2003 - Saved by the Belles, Ziad Touma
2004 - Sugar, John Palmer
2005 - Everyone, Bill Marchant
2006 - Amnesia: The James Brighton Enigma, Denis Langlois; 533 Statements, Tori Foster
2007 - The Chinese Botanist's Daughters, Dai Sijie
2008 - Be Like Others, Tanaz Eshaghian
2009 - Fig Trees, John Greyson
2010 - Mark, Mike Hoolboom
2011 - Home of the Buffalo, Rémy Huberdeau
2012 - She Said Boom!: The Story of Fifth Column, Kevin Hegge
2013 - For Dorian, Rodrigo Barriuso
2014 - Tom at the Farm, Xavier Dolan
2015 - What We Have (Ce qu'on a), Maxime Desmons
2016 - Closet Monster, Stephen Dunn
2017 - Rebels on Pointe, Bobbi Jo Hart
2018 - Love, Scott, Laura Marie Wayne
2019 - Drag Kids, Megan Wennberg
2020 - No Ordinary Man, Aisling Chin-Yee and Chase Joynt
2021 - Fanny: The Right to Rock, Bobbi Jo Hart
2022 - Out in the Ring, Ry Levey

Best First Feature Film (Bill Sherwood Award)
2009 - To Each Her Own, Heather Tobin
2010 - Plan B, Marco Berger
2011 - Black Field, Vardis Marinakis
2012 - N/A
2013 - Animals, Marçal Forés
2014 - 52 Tuesdays, Sophie Hyde
2015 - How to Win at Checkers (Every Time), Josh Kim
2016 - Spa Night, Andrew Ahn
2017 - God's Own Country, Francis Lee
2018 - Retablo, Alvaro Delgado-Aparicio
2019 - A Dog Barking at the Moon, Xiang Zi
2020 - No Hard Feelings (Futur Drei), Faraz Shariat
2021 - Sweetheart, Marley Morrison
2022 - Homebody, Joseph Sackett

Best Documentary
1998 - The Brandon Teena Story, Susan Muska and Greta Olafsdottir
1999 - I Know a Place, Roy Mitchell
2000 - Living with Pride: Ruth C. Ellis @ 100, Yvonne Welbon
2001 - Queen of the Whole Wide World, Roger Hyde
2002 - Ruthie and Connie: Every Room in the House, Deborah Dickson
2003 - Children of the Crocodile, Marsha Emerman 
2004 - Superstar in a Housedress, Craig B. Highberger
2005 - Fag Hags: Women Who Love Gay Men, Justine Pimlott
2006 - The End of Second Class, Nancy Nicol
2007 - Red Without Blue, Benita Sills, Todd Sills and Brooke Sebold
2008 - She's a Boy I Knew, Gwen Haworth
2009 - Ferron: Girl on a Road, Gerry Rogers
2010 - The Topp Twins: Untouchable Girls, Leanne Pooley
2011 - We Were Here, David Weissman
2012 - N/A
2013 - Bridegroom, Linda Bloodworth-Thomason
2014 - Matt Shepard Is a Friend of Mine, Michele Josue
2015 - Game Face, Michiel Thomas
2016 - Major!, Annalise Ophelian
2017 - Chavela, Catherine Gund and Daresha Kyi
2018 - Call Her Ganda, PJ Raval
2019 - We Are the Radical Monarchs, Linda Goldstein Knowlton
2020 - Little Girl (La petite fille), Sébastien Lifshitz
2021 - A Sexplanation, Alexander Liu
2022 - Gateways Grind, Jacquie Lawrence

Best Canadian Short Film
1998 - Why I Hate Bees, Sarah Abbott
1999 - Swerve, Andrea Dorfman
2000 - Helpless Maiden Makes an I Statement, Thirza Cuthand; Unmapping Desire, Sheila James; Quiver, Scott Beveridge
2001 - Rainmakers Zimbabwe, Robbie Hart; Sea in the Blood, Richard Fung; Viens Dehors! (Come Out!), Éric Tessier
2002 - Play, She Said, Lex Vaughn; The Salivation Army, Scott Treleaven
2003 - This Boy, Amy Burt; Audition Tape, Benny Nemerofsky Ramsay
2004 - Listen, Susan Justin; A Moth and a Butterfly, Gilbert Kwong
2005 - Girl on Girl, Miss Nomer Collective
2006 - Jean Genet in Chicago, Frederic Moffat; Sweater People, Nicole Chung
2007 - The Saddest Boy in the World, Jamie Travis; Black Men and Me, Michèle Pearson Clarke
2008 - For a Relationship, Jim Verburg
2009 - The Golden Pin, Cuong Ngo
2010 - Rex vs. Singh, Richard Fung, John Greyson and Ali Kazimi
2011 - Dance to Miss Chief, Kent Monkman
2012 - Narcissus, Coral Short
2013 - Stop Calling Me Honey Bunny, Gabrielle Zilkha
2014 - Waack Revolt: A Dance Film, Sonia Hong
2015 - Hole, Martin Edralin
2016 - Never Steady, Never Still, Kathleen Hepburn
2017 - Picture This, Jari Osborne
2018 - The Things You Think I'm Thinking, Sherren Lee
2019 - Soft Spot, Justine Stevens
2020 - Swimmers, Chris Ross
2021 - You Will Still Be Here Tomorrow, Michael Hanley
2022 - Thot or Not, Dylan Glynn

Emerging Canadian Artist
2011 - Swim, Jordan Tannahill
2012 - Akin, Chase Joynt
2013 - Happy Birthday Chad!, Jason Sharman
2014 - Tru Love, Kate Johnston and Shauna MacDonald; 100 Crushes, Chapter 6: They, Elisha Lim
2015 - Beat, Tricia Hagoriles
2016 - Pyotr495, Blake Mawson
2017 - Faggot (Tapette), Olivier Perrier
2018 - For Nonna Anna, Luis De Filippis
2019 - Skies Are Not Just Blue, Lysandre Cosse-Tremblay
2020 - Body So Fluorescent, David Di Giovanni
2021 - Pitoc e icinakosian, Jos-Onimskiw Ottawa-Dubé and Gerry Ottawa
2022 - Save the Date, Bria McLaughlin

See also
 List of LGBT film festivals
 List of film festivals in Canada

References

External links
 

Film festivals in Toronto
Film festivals in Ottawa
LGBT film festivals in Canada
LGBT culture in Toronto
LGBT culture in Ottawa
Film festivals established in 1991
1991 establishments in Ontario
LGBT film awards